Wolfiporia cartilaginea is a species of fungus in the order Polyporales. Found in northeastern China, it was described as new to science by Norwegian mycologist Leif Ryvarden in 1986. The type locality was the Changbaishan National Nature Reserve in Jilin province. Fruitbodies of the fungus are resupinate, with tiny pores measuring 3–4 per millimetre. The ellipsoidal spores are hyaline (translucent), non-amyloid, and measure 4–5 by 2–2.5 µm.

References

Polyporaceae
Fungi described in 1986
Fungi of China
Taxa named by Leif Ryvarden